Sibbesse is a former Samtgemeinde ("collective municipality") in the district of Hildesheim, in Lower Saxony, Germany. Its seat was in the village Sibbesse. On 1 November 2016 it was dissolved.

The Samtgemeinde Sibbesse consisted of the following municipalities:

 Adenstedt 
 Almstedt 
 Eberholzen 
 Sibbesse
 Westfeld

Former Samtgemeinden in Lower Saxony